Gabriel Hidalgo Bordado Jr., also known as Gabby Bordado Jr. (born February 15, 1955), is a Philippine politician and writer.

Biography
Rep. Gabby Bordado Jr. was born in Calabanga, Camarines Sur. He studied at the University of the Philippines at Los Baños and Diliman and took non-degree short courses at the National University of Singapore.

Rep. Bordado Jr. is married to Georgina ( Junsay) Bordado, the first female president of the Central Bicol University of Agriculture (CBSUA). They have three children.

Career
Rep. Gabby Bordado Jr. has a prolific career in the public sector. He was first appointed as the Acting City Administrator of Naga City in 1993 before serving the city as a councilor from 1995-2004 and 2013-2016 (when he pulled out from the congressional race to give way to former Vice President Atty. Maria Leonor "Leni" Gerona Robredo). He then became the Vice Mayor of Naga City for three consecutive terms (2004-2013). And in 2016, Rep. Bordado Jr. was elected as the representative of the 3rd district of Camarines Sur, composed of the City of Naga and the municipalities of Bombon, Calabanga, Camaligan, Canaman, Magarao, Ocampo, and the capital town of Pili. He is currently on his third and last term as a district representative.

In his tenure as the representative of the third district of Camarines Sur, Rep. Bordado Jr. authored and co-authored numerous bills of national and local importance. He was among the principal authors of the Pantawid Pamilyang Pilipino (4Ps) Act. Other notable bills include RA 10931, The Universal Access to Quality Tertiary Education Act; RA 10968, Philippine Qualifications Framework Act; RA 11035, National School Feeding Program for Public Kindergarten and Elementary Pupils; RA Philippine Food Technology Act; RA 6452, Comprehensive Mental Act; RA 5792, Protected Areas System Act; RA 5670, Free Irrigation Act; and RA 11054, Bangsamoro Organic Law. Among these bills, he considers Republic Act No. 11478 which seeks to modernize the Bicol Medical Center in Naga City by increasing the bed capacity from 500 to one thousand (1,000) beds as well as upgrading its service facilities and professional health care services as his legacy. 

During the COVID-19 pandemic, Rep. Bordado Jr. continued responding and addressing his constituents' concerns through different programs, such as additional Tulong Panghanapbuhay sa Ating Disadvantaged/Displaced Workers (TUPAD) allocations,  that aimed to alleviate unemployment in the district, as well as more livelihood programs through the establishment of community-organized cooperatives. He also pioneered the Bayanihan E-ataman in his district, which is the local counterpart of former Vice President Leni Robredo’s Bayanihan E-konsulta program that assisted COVID-19 patients and their immediate families.

Rep. Bordado Jr., who has been twice-elected as an assistant minority leader (18th and 19th Congress), continues to be a notable public servant. In 2020, he received the Distinguished Alumnus Award for Good Governance and Public Service from the UP College of Public Affairs and Development Alumni Association.

Before he became a congressman, Rep. Bordado Jr. occasionally wrote articles and poems for national newspapers and magazines. A number of his poems had been anthologized in two books published by the National Commission for Culture and the Arts. And in 2014, he published his first book under the Ateneo De Naga Press, an anthology entitled “Tilling Fields”.

References

1955 births
Liberal Party (Philippines) politicians
Living people
Politicians from Camarines Sur
Members of the House of Representatives of the Philippines from Camarines Sur
Filipino city and municipal councilors
University of the Philippines Los Baños alumni